The Deferribacteraceae are a family of gram-negative bacteria which make energy by anaerobic respiration.

Description
Deferribacteraceae are rod-shaped, although the rods may be straight or bent. They are gram-negative. Deferribacteraceae perform anaerobic respiration using iron, manganese, or nitrate. They can also produce energy by fermentation. The type genus of the family is Deferribacter.

Phylogeny

Taxonomy
The currently accepted taxonomy is based on the List of Prokaryotic names with Standing in Nomenclature (LSPN) 

 Phylum Deferribacterota Garrity and Holt 2021
 Class Deferribacteres Huber & Stetter 2002
 Order Deferribacterales Huber & Stetter 2002
 Genus ?Petrothermobacter Tamazawa et al. 2017
 Family "Calditerrivibrionaceae" Spring et al. 2022
 Genus Calditerrivibrio Iino et al. 2008
 Family Deferribacteraceae Huber & Stetter 2002
 Genus Deferribacter Greene et al. 1997
 Family "Deferrivibrionaceae" Zavarzina et al. 2022
 Genus "Deferrivibrio" Zavarzina et al. 2022
 Family "Flexistipitaceae" Spring et al. 2022
 Genus Flexistipes Fiala et al. 2000
 Family "Geovibrionaceae" Cavalier-Smith 2020
 Genus Denitrovibrio Myhr & Torsvik 2000
 Genus Geovibrio Caccavo et al. 2000
 Genus  "Limisalsivibrio" Spring et al. 2022
 Genus Seleniivibrio  Rauschenbach et al. 2013
 Family "Mucispirillaceae" Spring et al. 2022
 Genus Mucispirillum Robertson et al. 2005

History
The family was first described in 2001 in order to hold the genera Deferribacter, Flexistipes, and Geovibrio.

See also
 List of bacterial orders
 List of bacteria genera

References

Deferribacterota